Little Bitterroot Lake is a census-designated place (CDP) in Flathead County, Montana, United States. The population was 194 at the 2010 census. The town is next to Little Bitterroot Lake.

Demographics

References

Census-designated places in Flathead County, Montana
Census-designated places in Montana